Jim Chappell is a restaurateur from Keokuk, Iowa. He attended then-Drury College in Springfield, Missouri. From 1986 until 2018 he owned Chappell’s Restaurant, as a sports and political bar.

Chappell was a 1978 Missouri State Senate candidate. 

Throughout his adult life, he has been appointed to several boards and commissions. He was chairman of the City Plan Commission; the commissioner of the Kansas City, Missouri Port Authority; and chairman of the Clay County Board of Election Commissioners. 

Chappell currently sits on the board of directors for the Valley View Holding Company and chairman of the board for the First Bank of Missouri. In the fall of 2012, Jim Chappell co-authored "Conversations at Chappell's" with Matt Fulks.

In 2013, Chappell was inducted into the Missouri Sports Hall of Fame. He lives in the Kansas City area with his wife, Gina. They have two married daughters and five grandchildren.

References

External links
Stltoday.com
Chappellskc.com
Amazon.com

Living people
People from Keokuk, Iowa
Year of birth missing (living people)
Businesspeople from Kansas City, Missouri
Drury University alumni
American restaurateurs